The Canal del Dique ( Levee Channel) is a 118 km artificial canal connecting Cartagena Bay (at the corregimiento of Pasacaballos) to the Magdalena River in the Bolívar Department in northern Colombia. The canal is a bifurcation or artificial arm of the Magdalena River, and its eastern portion forms most of the border between the departments of Bolívar and Atlántico. The port on the Magdalena River is Calamar.

History
The canal was needed since the mouth of the Magdalena River (which provided access into the interior of Colombia) was virtually impenetrable, and Colombia's two main colonial ports (Cartagena and Santa Marta) had no access to the river. It was built by the Spanish in 1582 but quickly fell into disrepair; it was rebuilt in 1650.

However, by the end of the 18th century, it had become impassable except during times of high runoff, and by 1821 it was completely blocked. Thus, trade moved increasingly away from Cartagena to Santa Marta and Sabanilla (a port near the mouth of the Magdalena, later eclipsed by Puerto Colombia and Barranquilla). By 1831 traders in the city began to lobby for the canal's reopening, but repeated efforts to redredge the channel failed and by the end of the 19th century a railroad had replaced it.

George Totten engineer, helped rebuild part of this canal, in the mid-19th century.

In 1923 and 1952, the canal was improved, but use then began to decline due to increased sedimentation of the Magdalena River.

Currently, a modernization of the channel is being considered in order to boost trade in the port of Cartagena.

Since 2013, river diversions have been planned with Dutch company Royal Haskoning DHV to control sediment and water flow along the canal. This has led to creation of a new mangrove  wetland area, land building and ecological restoration in the region.

In the literature
The canal figures prominently in Gabriel Garcia Marquez's novel Love in the Time of Cholera.

References

External links

 The Canal del Dique Corporation (Spanish)

Canals in Colombia
Canals opened in 1582